Ingeborg Buhl (15 January 1880 – 13 August 1963) was a Danish fencer. She competed in the women's foil competition at the 1924 Summer Olympics.

References

External links
 

1880 births
1963 deaths
People from Frederikshavn Municipality
Danish female foil fencers
Olympic fencers of Denmark
Fencers at the 1924 Summer Olympics
Sportspeople from the North Jutland Region